Banneux is a village of Wallonia in the municipality of Sprimont, district of Louveigné, located in the province of Liège, Belgium. 

It is known because of the reported Marian apparitions of Our Lady of Banneux, also known as Our Lady of the Poor to a young girl called Mariette Beco.

Sources
Belgian Tourist Office

External links

Shrine of Our Lady of the Poor at Banneux

Populated places in Liège Province
Sprimont